Irene Hamilton-Oldfather (born 1954 in Glasgow) is a Scottish Labour Party politician. She was the Member of the Scottish Parliament (MSP) for the Cunninghame South constituency from 1999 until 2011, when she was defeated by the SNP's Margaret Burgess.

During her time in Parliament, Oldfather served primarily on the European and External Relations Committee, acting as Convener for parts of both the 1999 and 2007 Sessions, and as Deputy Convener between 2003 and 2007. She was also co-chair of the Parliament's working group on prescription drug dependency. She was a member of North Ayrshire Council, being first elected in 1995, but was defeated in the 2017 Scottish local elections. She served as the council's vice-chair for education.

Oldfather is the director of the Health and Social Care Alliance Scotland. She was a history lecturer at the University of Arizona.

She attended Bank Street Primary and Irvine Royal Academy. She attended the University of Strathclyde, graduating with a BSc (Honours) and MSc in Politics.

References

External links 
 

1954 births
Living people
Labour MSPs
Members of the Scottish Parliament 1999–2003
Members of the Scottish Parliament 2003–2007
Members of the Scottish Parliament 2007–2011
Female members of the Scottish Parliament
20th-century Scottish women politicians